Du Mingyang (born 20 January 1993) is a Chinese professional football player who currently plays as a midfielder.

Club career
In 2013, Du Mingyang started his professional footballer career with Beijing Guoan in the Chinese Super League. He was sent to the reserved team in 2015. On 18 May 2016, Du made his debut for Beijing Guoan in the 2016 Chinese Super League against Hebei China Fortune, coming on as a substitute for Zhang Xiaobin in the 78th minute. He scored his first goal for Beijing Guoan on 23 October 2016, in a 3–1 home win against Guangzhou R&F.
In March 2018，Du signed for China Amateur Football League side Wuhan Chufeng Heli.

Du transferred to League One side Meizhou Hakka in February 2019. He would make his debut in a league game on 10 March 2019 against Beijing BSU that ended in a 1-0 victory.

Career statistics
Statistics accurate as of match played 31 December 2021.

References

External links

1993 births
Living people
Chinese footballers
Footballers from Jiangsu
Beijing Guoan F.C. players
Meizhou Hakka F.C. players
China League One players
China League Two players
Chinese Super League players
Association football midfielders